Philip Atta Basoah is a Ghanaian politician and member of the Seventh Parliament of the Fourth Republic of Ghana representing the Kumawu Constituency in the Ashanti Region on the ticket of the New Patriotic Party.

Early life 
Philip was born on November 18, 1969. He hails from Kumawu in the Ashanti region of Ghana.

Education 
He had master's degree at the Paris graduate school of management in 2012 and also had Bachelor of Arts at the University of Cape Coast, Ghana in 2000. He also had his GCE A level in 1994 and his GCE O level in 1991 and his MLSC in 1986.

Career 
He was the projects coordinator for Ghana Education Service in the Ashanti Region. He was also the District Chief Executive at the Ministry of Local Government for the Sekyere East District from June 2005 to January 2009. He was a tutor at the Agogo Senior High School.

Political career 
He is a member of NPP and currently the MP for the Kumawu Constituency in the Ashanti region. In the 2016 Ghana general elections, he won the parliamentary seat with 21,794 votes making 78.2% of the total votes cast whilst the NDC parliamentary aspirant Emmanuel William Amoako had 5,899 votes making 21.2% of the total votes cast whiles the CPP parliament aspirant Opoku Kyei Clifford had 188 votes making 0.7% of the total votes cast. In 2020 Ghana general elections, he won the parliamentary seat with 14,960 votes making 51.1% of the total votes cast whilst the NDC parliamentary aspirant Bernard Opoku Marfo had 2,439 votes making 8.3% of the total votes cast whiles the Independent parliament aspirant Duah Kwaku had 11,698 votes making 40% of the total votes cast and the GUM parliament aspirant Nana Amoako had 174 votes making 0.6% of the total votes cast.

Committees 
He is the Chairperson for Employment, Social Welfare and State Enterprises Committee and also a member of Lands and Forestry Committee and also a member of the Selection Committee.

Personal life 
He is a Christian.

Philanthropy 
In April 2021, he presented training equipment to artisans in the Kumawu Constituency to aid the youth acquire employable skills.

References 

Ghanaian MPs 2017–2021
1969 births
Living people
New Patriotic Party politicians
Ghanaian MPs 2021–2025